Jeremy Black  (born 30 October 1955) is a British historian, writer, and former professor of history at the University of Exeter. He is a senior fellow at the Center for the Study of America and the West at the Foreign Policy Research Institute in Philadelphia, US.

Black is the author of over 180 books, principally but not exclusively on 18th-century British politics and international relations, and has been described by one commentator as "the most prolific historical scholar of our age". He has published on military and political history, including Warfare in the Western World, 1882-1975 (2001) and The World in the Twentieth Century (2002).

Background

He taught at Durham University from 1980 as a lecturer, then professor. He was awarded a PhD from Durham, entitled British Foreign Policy 1727–1731, in 1983. As a staff candidate he was not attached to any of the Durham colleges. 

He was editor of Archives, journal of the British Records Association, from 1989 to 2005. He has served on the Council of the British Records Association (1989–2005); the Council of the Royal Historical Society (1993–1996 and 1997–2000); and the Council of the List and Index Society (from 1997). He has sat on the editorial boards of History Today, International History Review, Journal of Military History, Media History and the Journal of the Royal United Service Institution (now the RUSI Journal).

Awards and honours

In 2008, he was awarded the Samuel Eliot Morison Prize for lifetime achievement as afforded by the Society for Military History.

Works

Books

 Geographies of War (2022) 
 A Brief History of Britain 1851-2021: From World Power to ? (2022) 
 A Brief History of London (2022) 
 A Brief History of Britain 1851-2021 (2022) 
 A Brief History of the British Monarchy. From the Iron Age to King Charles III (2022) 
 A Brief History of Germany (2022) 
 A Brief History of the Atlantic (2022) 
 A History of Britain in 100 Maps (2022) 
 The French Revolutionary and Napoleonic Wars (2022) 
 The Game Is Afoot: The Enduring World of Sherlock Homes. 2022
 The Importance of Being Poirot. 2022 
 A Short History of War. 2021 
 Strategy and the Second World War. 2021
 A Brief History of Britain 1851-2021: From World Power to? 2022
 England in the Age of Austen. 2021
 England in the Age of Dickens. 2021
 France: A Short History. 2021
 A History of the Second World War in 100 Maps. 2020
 Military Strategy: A Global History. 2020
 George III: Madness and Majesty. 2020
 Tank Warfare 2020
 A Brief History of Portugal. 2020
 A Brief History of the Mediterranean. 2020
 History of the Twentieth Century. 2020
 A History of The World: From Prehistory to the 21st Century. 2019
 Introduction to Global Military History: 1750 to the Present Day. 2019
 England in the Age of Shakespeare. 2019
 Charting the Past. The Historical Worlds of Eighteenth-Century England. 2019
 A Brief History of Spain. 2019
 War and its Causes. 2019
 The English Press, a History. 2019
 The World at War 1914–45. 2019
 History of Europe: From Prehistory to the 21st Century. 2019
 Imperial Legacies: The British Empire Around the World. 2019
 English Nationalism: A Short History. 2018
 Mapping Naval Warfare: A Visual History of Conflict at Sea. 2017
 Naval Warfare: A Global History since 1860. 2017
 Plotting Power: Strategy in the Eighteenth Century. 2017
 Geographies of an Imperial Power: The British World, 1688–1815. 2017
 Combined Operations: A Global History of Amphibious and Airborne Warfare. 2017
 The World of James Bond: The Lives and Times of 007. 2017
 A History of Britain 1945 to Brexit. 2017
 Maps of War: Mapping Conflict Through the Centuries. 2016
 Air Power. 2016
 The Holocaust: History and Memory. 2016
 Insurgency and Counterinsurgency. 2016
 (ed.) The Tory World: Deep History and the Tory Theme in British Foreign Policy, 1679–2014. 2015
 The Cold War. 2015
 The City on the Hill: A Life of the University of Exeter. 2015
 Rethinking World War Two: The Conflict and its Legacy. 2015
 War in Europe. 2015
 The Atlantic Slave Trade in World History. 2015
 Metropolis: Mapping the City. 2015
 A Short History of Britain. 2015
 Other Pasts, Different Presents, Alternative Futures. 2015
 Clio’s Battles: Historiography in Practice. 2015
 Geopolitics and the Quest for Dominance. 2015
 The British Empire. 2015
 A Century of Conflict. 2014
 Politics and Foreign Policy in the Age of George I, 1714–1727. 2014
 British Politics and Foreign Policy, 1727–44. 2014
 The Power of Knowledge: How Information and Technology Made the Modern World. 2014
 London: A History. 2013
 War in the Eighteenth Century World. 2013
 War and Technology. 2013
 Introduction to Global Military History: 1775 to the Present Day. 2012
 A History of the British Isles (3rd edn). 2012
 Avoiding Armageddon: From the Great War to the Fall of France, 1918–40. 2012
 War and the Cultural Turn. 2012
 Slavery. 2011
 Fighting for America. 2011
 Debating Foreign Policy in Eighteenth Century Britain. 2011
 The Great War and the Making of the Modern World. 2011
 War in the World 1450–1600. 2011
 Crisis of Empire. 2010
 A History of Diplomacy. 2010
 Waterloo. 2010
 War: A Short History. 2010
 
 
 Great Powers and the Quest for Hegemony: The World Order since 1500. 2008
 
 
 
 
 
 
 
 
  e-book
 
 
 
 
 
 
 editor: 

editor: 

with Donald MacRaild: 

editor: 

 Modern British History since 1900 (2000)
 A New History of England (2000)
 Historical Atlas of Britain: The End of the Middle to the Georgian Era (2000)
 Britain as a Military Power, 1688–1815 (1999)
 Why Wars Happen (1998)
 War and the World, 1450–2000 (1998)
 Maps and History (1997)
 Maps and Politics (1997)
 America or Europe: British Foreign Policy, 1739–63 (1997)
 History of the British Isles (1996)
 Illustrated History of Eighteenth Century Britain (1996)
 Warfare Renaissance to Revolution, 1492–1792 (1996)
 British Foreign Policy in an Age of Revolution (1994)
 Convergence or Divergence? Britain and the Continent (1994)
 European Warfare, 1660–1815 (1994)
 The Politics of Britain, 1688–1800 (1993)
 History of England (1993)

 Pitt the Elder (1992)
 A System of Ambition? British Foreign Policy, 1660–1793 (1991)

 War for America: The Fight for Independence 1775–1783 (1991)
 Sir Robert Walpole and the Nature of Politics in Early Eighteenth Century Britain (1990)
 Culloden and the '45 (1990)
 The Rise of the European Powers 1679–1793 (1990)
 The English Press in the Eighteenth Century (1987)
 The Collapse of the Anglo-French Alliance 1727–31 (1987)
 Natural and Necessary Enemies: Anglo-French Relations in the Eighteenth Century (1986)
 The British and the Grand Tour (1985)
 British Foreign Policy in the Age of Austria (1985)

Articles
  Black, Jeremy. "Could the British Have Won the American War of Independence?."  Journal of the Society for Army Historical Research. (Autumn 1996), Vol. 74 Issue 299, pp 145–154. online 90 minute video lecture, requires Real Player

References

Further reading

External links

Official website

Jeremy Black, "Islam and the West: A Historical Perspective," Foreign Policy Research Institute, Volume 4, Number 2, May 2003

Jeremy Black, H-France Forum Volume 2, Issue 3 (Summer 2007), No. 3

Jeremy Black, "What Students Need to Know About War, and Why", 25 February 2009

1955 births
British historians
Living people
Alumni of Queens' College, Cambridge
Alumni of Merton College, Oxford
Academics of Durham University
Academics of the University of Exeter
British military historians
History journal editors
Historians of the American Revolution
Historians of the British Isles
Historians of France
Historians of World War II
History Today people
Alumni of Durham University
People from Cambridge